Red Hill railway station was the terminus of the Red Hill railway line. The line was opened in 1921 and was one of the more short-lived branch lines on the Victorian Railways, closing in 1953, along with a few other smaller branch lines on the railways system. For a few years after the closure of the line, railmotors continued to run as far as Balnarring, to cater for the Balnarring picnic races and the Lord Somers Camp, as well as an Australian Railway Historical Society tour in 1956.

Part of the railway alignment between the former Red Hill and Merricks stations has been converted into the Red Hill Rail Trail, but the majority of the right-of-way has been sold to adjacent private landholders.

References

Disused railway stations in Melbourne
Railway stations in Australia opened in 1921
Railway stations closed in 1952